Ahmedabad Suburban Railway is a planned regional rail system in the city of Ahmedabad, Gujarat, India.

History 
The suburban railway was proposed to let people live in satellite towns and commute easily making less pressure on urban infrastructure. The project was conceptualised by the Delhi Metro Board around 2003. The Detailed Project Review was submitted to the Gujarat Infrastructure Development Board (GIDB) by Delhi Metro Rail Corporation in October 2005. GIDB sent it to RITES for verification. The project had received approval in 2009 but was not implemented. During Vibrant Gujarat Global Investors Summit 2015, MOU was signed with Rail Vikas Nigam Ltd for a suburban railway system in Ahmedabad. Later it was announced in 2016 Union Rail Budget.

Corridors 
The project will use the existing Right of Way of Indian Railways, passing through Ahmedabad by upgrading and integrating existing facilities. Two corridors are planned for Ahmedabad Suburban Railway.

 Corridor 1 : Barejadi-Ahmedabad Junction-Kalol (43.49 km) with stops at Geratpur, Vatva, Maninagar, Sabarmati, Chandkheda, Khodiyar, and Saij Sertha Road
 Corridor 2 : Ahmedabad Junction-Naroda (9.47 km) with stops at Asarva, Ahmedabad Airport, Saijpur and Sardargram

References

External links
 RRS on GIDB website

Rail transport in Gujarat
Proposed railway lines in India
Transport in Ahmedabad